Jan Raszka (2 December 1928 – 5 February 2007) was a Polish skier. He competed in the Nordic combined event at the 1956 Winter Olympics.

References

External links
 

1928 births
2007 deaths
Polish male Nordic combined skiers
Olympic Nordic combined skiers of Poland
Nordic combined skiers at the 1956 Winter Olympics
People from Wisła
20th-century Polish people